The Cathedral of Our Lady of the Pillar and St. Raphael is the main Roman Catholic church building of Melo, Uruguay. It is the see of the Roman Catholic Diocese of Melo.

It is dedicated to the Virgin of the Pillar and the Archangel Raphael.

Visit of John Paul II 
In 1988, during his second pastoral visit to Uruguay, Pope John Paul II visited this cathedral. This visit inspired the film The Pope's Toilet, which received several awards and was Uruguay's submission to the 80th Academy Awards for the Academy Award for Best Foreign Language Film, although it was not accepted as a nominee.

See also
 List of Roman Catholic cathedrals in Uruguay
 Roman Catholic Diocese of Melo

References

External links
 
 Views of the Cathedral
 Diocese of Melo
 Blog

Religion in Cerro Largo Department
Buildings and structures in Cerro Largo Department
Melo
Roman Catholic churches completed in 1888
Melo, Uruguay
19th-century Roman Catholic church buildings in Uruguay